Yagodny is a rural locality (a khutor) in Krutovskoye Rural Settlement, Serafimovichsky District, Volgograd Oblast, Russia. The population was 28 as of 2010.

Geography 
Yagodny is located on the left bank of the Krivaya River, 184 km west of Serafimovich (the district's administrative centre) by road. Nizhnekrivskoy is the nearest rural locality.

References 

Rural localities in Serafimovichsky District